The 11th British Academy Film Awards, given by the British Academy of Film and Television Arts, were held on 6 March 1958, to honor the best national and foreign films of 1957.

Winners and nominees

Best Film
 The Bridge on the River Kwai 
12 Angry Men
3:10 to Yuma
The Bachelor Party
Edge of the City
The Shiralee
That Night!
The Tin Star
Windom's Way
Paths of Glory
Pather Panchali
Celui qui doit mourir
Heaven Knows, Mr. Allison
Porte des Lilas
The Prince and the Showgirl
A Man Escaped or: The Wind Bloweth Where It Listeth

Best British Film
 The Bridge on the River Kwai 
The Prince and the Showgirl
The Shiralee
Windom's Way

Best Foreign Actor
 Henry Fonda in 12 Angry Men 
Sidney Poitier in Edge of the City
Ed Wynn in The Great Man
Robert Mitchum in Heaven Knows, Mr. Allison
Pierre Brasseur in Porte des Lilas
Tony Curtis in Sweet Smell of Success
Richard Basehart in Time Limit
Jean Gabin in La Traversee de Paris

Best British Actor
 Alec Guinness in The Bridge on the River Kwai 
Trevor Howard in Manuela
Laurence Olivier in The Prince and the Showgirl
Michael Redgrave in Time Without Pity
Peter Finch in Windom's Way

Best British Actress
 Heather Sears in The Story of Esther Costello 
Deborah Kerr in Tea and Sympathy
Sylvia Syms in Woman in a Dressing Gown

Best Foreign Actress
 Simone Signoret in Les Sorcieres de Salem 
Katharine Hepburn in The Rainmaker
Joanne Woodward in The Three Faces of Eve
Augusta Dabney in That Night!
Eva Marie Saint in A Hatful of Rain
Marilyn Monroe in The Prince and the Showgirl
Lilli Palmer in Anastasia - Die letzte Zarentochter

Best British Screenplay
 The Bridge on the River Kwai - Pierre Boulle

References

Film011
British Academy Film Awards
British Academy Film Awards
British Academy Film Awards